The term red–green–brown alliance, originating in France in the 2000s, refers to the alliance of leftists (red), Islamists (green), and the far right (brown). The term has also been used to describe alleged alliances of industrial union-focused leftists (red), ecologically-minded agrarians (green), and the far right (brown).

History 
French essayist Alexandre del Valle wrote of "a red–brown–green ... ideological alliance" in a 22 April 2002 article in the centre-right Le Figaro newspaper, also writing of "red–brown–green, the strange alliance" in a January 2004 article in the Politique Internationale magazine. Del Valle's conceptual rendering of Islamist ideological trends appears to be based at least partially on earlier writings in which he charged the United States and Western Europe with favouring the "war machine" of "armed Islamism" via its funding of the Afghanistani mujahideen in the Soviet–Afghan War during the Ronald Reagan presidency. In 2010, Del Valle published an essay in Italy titled "" ("Red, Black, Green: The Meeting of Extreme Opposites").

The later popularity of the red–green–brown theory and its various permutations derives mainly from a speech given by Roger Cukierman, president of the Conseil Représentatif des Institutions juives de France (CRIF), to a CRIF banquet on 25 January 2003, and given prominence by a 27/28 January 2003 newspaper article in Le Monde. Cukierman used the French term "alliance brun-vert-rouge" to describe the antisemitic alignment supposedly shared by "an extreme right nostalgic for racial hierarchies" (symbolized by the colour brown in reference to the Sturmabteilung), "an extreme left [which is] anti-globalist, anti-capitalist, anti-American [and] anti-Zionist" (red), and followers of José Bové (green). In the United States, a similar alliance of disparate groups occurred in opposition to the World Trade Organization in the alter-globalization movement, which saw trade unions, neo-Luddite environmentalists, and paleoconservative nationalists like Pat Buchanan joining a common cause. Many were surprised by leftist Lenora Fulani's support for Buchanan, which has been viewed as an example of a red–green–brown alliance.

Similar terms

In Russia 

The red–brown term (krasno-korichnevye) originated in post-Soviet Russia to describe an alliance of communists and far-right (nationalist, fascist, monarchist, and religious) opposition to the liberal, pro-capitalist Russian government in the 1990s, opposing economic and social reforms such as rapid transition to a market economy through shock therapy, subsequent sharp increase in poverty and drop in living standards, and removal of many restrictions on people's behaviour. Such an alliance was first suggested by Aleksandr Dugin, an early member of the National Bolshevik Party and writer of the new Communist Party of the Russian Federation (CPRF) program. As leader of the opposition, Gennady Zyuganov oversaw the partnership of the CPRF with Russian National Unity, a prominent Russian neo-Nazi party.

As described by Alexander Reid Ross in his 2017 Against the Fascist Creep, in the 1990s Zyuganov also formed alliances with the neo-Nazi National Republican Party of Russia and the Soyuz Venedov, the latter of which, as described and paraphrased by Reid Ross, "'promotes the worship of pagan gods of the Slavic pantheon' while translating and disseminating German Nazi propaganda in Russian." After Zyuganov publicly proclaimed this new red–brown alliance, there was a noted rise in antisemitism within the CPRF, particularly driven by party official Albert Makashov, who openly called for the expulsion of Jews in Russia and met with David Duke, grand wizard of the Ku Klux Klan.

See also 

 Antisemitism in the Arab world
 Ecofascism
 Euston Manifesto
 Horseshoe theory
 
 Islamo-leftism
 Nasakom
 National-anarchism
 National Bolshevism
 Regressive left
 Red–green alliance
 Syncretic politics
 Tankie
 Third Position

References

Further reading

  To locate this article, see journal indices.
 
 
 
 
 
 
 
 
 
 
 
 
 
  Also published at webresistant.over-blog.com
  Also published at webresistant.over-blog.com.

Anti-Americanism
Conspiracy theories in France
Conspiracy theories involving Muslims
Communism in France
French nationalism
Islamism in France
New antisemitism
Political terminology